Leonard Dodson (March 29, 1912 – January 14, 1997) was an American professional golfer.

One of four boys, Dodson was born in Mumford, Missouri, and grew up in the Springfield area.

Dodson won three times on the early PGA Tour between 1936 and 1941.

During his colorful life, Dodson was known for gambling with friend Titanic Thompson. He was posthumously inducted into the Ozarks Golf Hall of Fame in 2004.

Professional wins (8)

PGA Tour wins (3)
1936 St. Petersburg Open
1937 Philadelphia Open Championship
1941 Oakland Open

Other wins (5)
1937 Iowa Open, Western Missouri-Eastern Kansas tournament, Hollywood Beach Hotel Open (Florida)
1946 Iowa Open
1948 Waterloo Open Golf Classic

References

American male golfers
PGA Tour golfers
Golfers from Missouri
People from Greene County, Missouri
1912 births
1997 deaths